Bandhu Tirkey is an Indian politician and a former Member of Jharkhand Legislative Assembly elected from Mandar of Jharkhand state as a member of Jharkhand Vikas Morcha (Prajatantrik) in 2019. He was expelled from his post on Feb, 2022 for having more money than stated to ECI.

Babulal Marandi expelled his party MLAs Pradeep Yadav and Tirkey from the party for anti-party activities. Both of them later joined Indian National Congress in its Delhi headquarters as Jharkhand Vikas Morcha (Prajatantrik) party was merged with Bharatiya Janata Party.

On March 28, 2022 Bandhu was convicted and sentenced to 3-year jail term related to corruption charges.

In April 2022, he was disqualified from the 5th Jharkhand Assembly after the conviction by the CBI court on disproportionate assets case.

References

1960 births
Living people
People from Ranchi district
Place of birth missing (living people)
Indian National Congress politicians from Jharkhand
Jharkhand Vikas Morcha (Prajatantrik) politicians
United Goans Democratic Party politicians
Jharkhand MLAs 2005–2009
Jharkhand MLAs 2009–2014
Jharkhand MLAs 2019–2024